Binod Bihari Mahato (23 September 1923 –  18 December 1991) was an advocate and politician. He established Shivaji Samaj, a social reform organisation among the Kudumi Mahato people. He was the founder of Jharkhand Mukti Morcha, established in 1972. He was a leader of the movement for the establishment of the separate state of Jharkhand. He was a member of Bihar Vidhan Sabha three times, in 1980, 1985 and 1990, and a member of the Lok Sabha from Giridih in 1991.

Early life
Binod Bihari Mahato was born on 23 September 1923 in Badadaha village in Baliapur division of Dhanbad district. His father was Mahendra Mahato and mother was Mandakini Devi. He was born into the family of Kudmi. His father was a farmer. His primary education was in Baliapur and he attended Jharia D.A.V. for middle school and then Dhanbad High English School.

Career
Because of family financial problems, Mahato did writing work as a daily labourer in Dhanbad court. He also worked as a teacher. Later he got a job as a clerk in Dhanbad. A lawyer told him that he might become clever but would still remain a clerk, and that made him decide to become a lawyer. He studied for the Intermediate Certificate from P.K. Ray Memorial College. He graduated from Ranchi College and then in law from Patna Law College. He began to practise as a lawyer in 1956 in Dhanbad. He fought cases for people who were displaced because of Bokaro Steel Plant, Bharat Coking Coal Limited, Central Coalfields, Panchet Dam, Maithon Dam and other developments.

Mahato stood in the election of 1952 in Jharia but was unsuccessful. In 1967, the Communist Party of India was divided. Mahato was a member of the Communist Party of India (Marxist). In 1971, he stood in Dhanbad Loksabha election on the ticket of the Communist Party of India (Marxists) and came second. He was a member of Vidhan Sabha representing Tundi from 1980 to 1985. He became Vidhan Sabha member representing Sindri and Tundi in 1990. He became a member of Lok Sabha representing Giridih in May 1991.

Personal life
He married Fulmani Devi. They had five sons, Raj Kishore Mahato, Nil Kamal Mahato, Chandra Shekhar Mahato, Pradeep Kumar Mahato, Ashok Kumar Mahato and two daughters, Chandrawati Devi and Tarawati Devi.

Culture and sports
Mahato was a lover of the culture of Jharkhand. He always attempted to promote folk songs, festivals and culture of Jharkhand. He organised competitions to promote folk dances of Jharkhand. He participated in festivals such as Gohal Puja, Tusu, Jitia, Karma, Sohrai and Manasa Puja. He worked to promote languages of Jharkhand, especially Kurmali, the language of Kudmi Mahato. He encouraged Laxmikant Mahato, the writer of Kudmali Sahitya and Vyakran, to promote Kurmali. The writer and poet of Khortha, Srinivas Punari, was his friend. Due to these efforts, the study of Kurmali started at Ranchi University.

Education
Mahoto tried to spread education. He gave the slogan of "Padho and Lado". He also donated money for the establishment of several schools and colleges.

Shivaji Samaj
Due to his Kudumi Mahato background, Mahato met several Kudmi in his profession. Kudmi were mainly farmers. They were simple, poorly educated and easily influenced by others. Kudmi have their own rituals and culture. Traditionally, Kudumi were performing these rituals of their own without Brahmin. In those days Brahmincal practices were entering into Kudmi culture. Some were trying to make Kudumi Khatriya by giving them janeu (scared thread) and some were suggesting Kudmi to get dikhya from Brahmin. Some were saying to classify Kudmi as Vaishya. Many Kudmi were starting practices such as Tilak and dahej which were not Kudmi custom. Alcoholism was increasing. To solve the problems faced by Kudmi, Mahato started an organisation called Shivaji Samaj in 1967. This worked to protect Kudumi from money-lenders and to fight social evils. Several meetings were held to solve the problems of society and to punish the culprits. Shivaji Samaj organised rallies for backward castes and Sri Karpuri Thakur's rally for backward castes.

Shivaji Samaj influenced Shibu Soren to set up Sonot Santal Samaj. Later Mandal and Teli Samaj were set up.

Some people called Shivaji Samaj a terrorist organisation. Several cases were lodged against its leaders. It works to promote the language, festival and culture of Kudumi. The reason Mahato called the organisation Shivaji Samaj was that he admired Chhatrapati Shivaji. He believed that Shivaji was Kurmi. Shivaji had fought against the tyranny of Aurangzeb. In this way Mahato was a social reformer.

Eventually Shivaji Samaj became the backbone of the Jharkhand movement. Then Shivaji Samaj and Sonot Santal Samaj merged and formed Jharkhand Mukti Morcha.

Jharkhand Mukti Morcha
Binod Bihari Mahato was a member of the Communist Party for 25 years. He did not believe in any of the Indian parties. He thought that the Indian National Congress and Jan Sangh were a party for feudalism and capitalism and not for dalit and backward castes. So it would be difficult to fight for dalit and backward caste as a member of these parties.

Then he created Jharkhand Mukti Morcha. Under the banner of Jharkhand Mukti Morcha several protests took place demanding a separate state of Jharkhand.

Mahato was a member of the Jharkhand coordination committee (JCC) along with Bindheswari Prasad Keshri, Sanjay Bosu Mullick, Santosh Rana and Surya Singh Besra. The committee tried to co-ordinate between different organisations who were demanding a separate state for Jharkhand. It sent a memorandum to form Jharkhand state. Central government formed a committee on the Jharkhand matter in 1989. It stressed the need of greater allocation of the development funds for the area.

Commemoration
Binod Bihari Mahto Koylanchal University

References

Jharkhand politicians
Bihar MLAs 1980–1985
Bihar MLAs 1985–1990
Bihar MLAs 1990–1995
Lok Sabha members from Bihar
1923 births
1991 deaths
Jharkhand Mukti Morcha politicians
Communist Party of India politicians from Jharkhand